Yang Jing (born 1963) is a Swiss-Chinese composer and concert pipa soloist.

Early life and education 
Yang grew up in Xuchang in Henan province, China. According to Yang, she came from an educated family that was regarded with suspicion during the Cultural Revolution. Her mother worked in a hospital, and her father was an army officer. One of her grandfathers died in prison after being accused of counterrevolution.

She started playing the pipa, the Chinese plucked lute, at the age of six. From 1976, at the age of 12, she started performing in an ensemble at the Henan Opera music school. 

From the age of 18, Yang studied at the Shanghai Conservatory of Music, and graduated in 1986. In 1998, she went to Japan to study with composer Minoru Miki, as she started to explore contemporary music, and later performed and recorded pipa concertos by Miki with Japanese orchestras. In 2003, she moved to Switzerland to complete a master's degree at University of the Arts Bern.

Career 
Yang became a pipa soloist with the China National Traditional Orchestra in 1986. In 1996, she started Qing Mei Jing Yue, billed as the first all-women traditional instrument quartet in China, including the erhu, yangqin, and guzeheng, in addition to the pipa.

In 1998, Yang began her collaboration with Pierre Favre, a Swiss percussionist, after meeting him at the Beijing Jazz Festival. In 2000, they performed as a duo in Beijing and Shanghai, and recorded their first album together, Moments, at a live concert.

In 1999, Yang released the album Village in the Floods, a unique recording of the pipa accompanied by piano, with pianist Arthur Mattli. The album was a fundraiser for Chinese flood victims.

Critical reception 
Yang's 2012 album Elements: New Music for Pipa by American Composers, recorded in Hawaii, received mixed reviews.

Notable compositions 

 Dance Along the Old Silk Road
 Nine Jade Chains, inspired by the poem The Song of the Pipa Player by Bai Juyi
 Geyser, inspired by Yellowstone National Park

Discography 

 «Moments II» Pierre Favre & Yang Jing 'Erzählungen 1 - 7' 

 «Segensfunken»  2021, Yang Jing music for Pipa

 «A TRAVELLER'S CHANT at Mount Lu»  2017, Yang Jing music for Choir and Ensembles with Calmus Ensemble; European Chinese Ensemble Klanglogo Deutschland; Naxos Records (CD)

 «Dancing on a Bridge» 2014, Yang Jing and Wolfgang Sieber; music for pipa and organ; Klanglogo Deutschland; NAXOS (CD)

 «No. 9» Yang Jing and Christy Doran; music for pipa, guqin and e-guitar; Leo Records (CD).

 «Elements» 2012, music for pipa by American composers, Albany Records (CD.

 «Transitions» 2012, music for pipa, chamber orchestra and choir, Ars Braemia (CD).

 «Step into the Future»- 4tett Different Song» 2012, Jazz 4tett: Yang Jing, Pipa/Guqin; Michel Wintsch, Piano; Baenz Oester,Bass; Norbert Pfammatter, Drums/Percussion; Leo Records(CD).

 «Live in Moscow» 2006, Yang Jing, Daniel Schnyder, Minoru Miki, Eskender Bekmambetov; music for pipa and string ensemble with Chamber Orchestra at the Kremlin, Moscow (CD).

 «Two in One» 2006, Yang Jing and Pierre Favre music for pipa and percussion. InTakt Records (CD)

 «Yang Jing & the Chamber Soloists Lucerne» 2005, Dan Dun, Minoru Miki, Daniel Schnyder; music for pipa and chamber ensemble (CD and DVD)

 «Pipa and Pipes» 2005, Yang Jing and Wolfgang Sieber; music for pipa and organ. (DVD)

 «Severed Dream of Dunhuang» 2004, Yang Jing pipa music. AMC Records (CD)

 «Magic Moments»  2004, Yang Jing and Pierre Favre; music for pipa and percussion; Dingo Products (DVD)

 «Asia Ensemble» 2004, Music from Asia; Traditional Musical instruments; Tokyo, (CD)

 «Pipa Concerto» 2004, Minoru Miki; music for Pipa with Tokyo Metropolitan Symphony Orchestra; Camerata Tokyo (CD)

 «Dance along the Old Silk Road» 2003 Yang Jing; pipa music, Dragon Music HK(CD)

 «Moments» 2001, Yang Jing and Pierre Favre; music for pipa and percussion; China Records (CD)

 «Disclosure» 1999, Yang Jing; pipa music, China Records (CD)

 «Evening Poem» 1999, Yang Jing and Others; Music for Chinese traditional instrumental quartet. China Records (CD)

 «Village in the Floods» 1998, Yang Jing and Arthur Mattli; music for pipa and piano; China Records (CD)

 «Send my passions in Red Beans» 1995, Yang Jing and Others; Music for Pipa with China National Traditional Orchestra and China Radio Orchestra (CD)

 «Butterfly Dream»'' 1986, Yang Jing; pipa music collection HK cassette

References
   

Pipa players
Guqin players
Swiss composers
Swiss women composers
Living people
Year of birth uncertain

External links 

 Yang Jing (official page)